Diana Farrington (born March 9, 1965) is an American politician in Michigan. Farrington is a member of the Michigan House of Representatives from the 30th district since 2017.

Early life 
Farrington was born in Sterling Heights, Michigan. Farrington grew up in Utica, Michigan. Farrington graduated from Utica High School.

Education 
Farrington attended Oakland University.

Career 
Farrington is a mortgage auditor. Farrington owns a sports photography company.

In November 2016, Farrington was elected as a member of the Michigan House of Representatives for District 30. Farrington is the chairperson of the Financial Services Committee.

Personal life 
Farrington's husband is Jeff Farrington, a former politician in Michigan. They have two children.

See also 
 2018 Michigan House of Representatives election

References

External links 
 Diana Farrington at gophouse.org
 Diana Farrington at ballotpedia.org
 Macomb County Delegation at Oakland.edu
 Macomb GOP

1965 births
Living people
Republican Party members of the Michigan House of Representatives
Women state legislators in Michigan
21st-century American politicians
21st-century American women politicians